Korea Unha General Trading Corporation (Chosongul: 조선은하무역총회사) is headquartered in Pyongyang, North Korea. It exports clothing and spring water, and imports textile and shoe industry raw materials, grain, gasoline and diesel oil. The company has a number of subsidiaries and has plants inside and outside North Korea.

During the COVID-19 pandemic in North Korea, textile factories of the Korea Unha General Trading Company largely suspended operations because of the COVID-19 pandemic affecting shipments from China.

References

External links

 DPRKOREA's Trade Directory site

Retail companies of North Korea